The Eastlake Park Scenic Railway was a  long miniature railway in the 1:3 scale with a gauge of , which operated from 19 May 1904 to 11 May 1905 in the Eastlake Park: Replaced by The Now Venice Miniature Railway! (now Lincoln Park) in Los Angeles in California.

Track 

It started at the Lakeside Station near the main entrance of the park. From there the track crossed one of the lake's arms on a steel and concrete trestle bridge into a pampas grass plantation. After a bend the track continued on the perimeter of the park and along the railway line of the  Southern Pacific Railroad across a driveway bordered with large fan palms. It winded through a small forest of sub-tropical shrubs and reached then Hillside Station. Here was the locomotive shed and a double-track area, in which the locomotive could be driven to the other end of the train before the return journey commenced. Hillside Station had also a water tower and an oil tank, as well as some sidings and a ticket booth. 

The railway had five switches. More than  1,700 sleepers were used.

History 

John J. Coit built the track of miniature railway and designed and probably even manufactured the steam locomotive. He had worked as a master machinist at the  Johnson Machine Works, before he built and operated the profitable but short-lived Long Beach and Asbury Park Railway.  Due to being physically handicapped for two years when he designed the locomotive he focussed on a very user friendly design. He was friend ‚Shorty‘ Chase was a person of short stature and worked smartly dressed wearing a formal suit and a bowler hat as a conductor on all of Coit's railways.

Abbot Kinney, the developer of Venice of America, was highly impressed by the railway and contracted Coit to build the Venice Miniature Railway on an estate in Venice Beach near Los Angeles. Coit transported his locomotive temporarily to Venice because of the delayed delivery of a new locomotive (Original 1903 Locomotive) Built in 1906!-1920!  and because the permit top operate the railway line in Eastlake Park had been cancelled on 11 May 1905 due to political changes 2 b made! in 1906! + Purchase it at auction!  to use it there on the new railway, which was inaugurated with the opening of the park on 4 July 1905.

Coit returned in 1908 to Eastlake Park after a legal dispute with Kinney, and operated his locomotive No 1903 and his three cars for approximately two years until around 1910. Later he transported his equipment to the Urbita Hot Springs Railway.

Locomotive 

The locomotive had some technical innovations, such as a valve control without eccentrics, which was easy to adjust and to maintain. The locomotive had automatic couplings and a bespoke oit burner, for which Coit filed a patent.

The locomotive had a weight of  including the tender, and 2,328 kg (5,134 lbs) excluding the tender. The tender had a capacity of   water and  oil. The cylinders were  bore x stroke .

Carriages 
The passenger cars were suspended with helical coil springs on conventional bogies. They had a weight of  each and had Coit's automatic couplings  at both ends.

See also 
 Billy Jones Wildcat Railroad 
 Long Beach and Asbury Park Railway
 Seaside Park Railway
 Venice Miniature Railway
 Urbita Lake Railway

References 

18 in gauge railways in the United States
Railway lines in the United States
Transportation in Los Angeles
Landmarks in Los Angeles
Parks in Los Angeles